Wildwood is an unincorporated community in the town of Eau Galle, St. Croix, Wisconsin, United States.

History
A post office called Wildwood was established in 1882, and remained in operation until it was discontinued in 1899. The community was named from a virgin forest surrounding the original town site.

Notes

Unincorporated communities in St. Croix County, Wisconsin
Unincorporated communities in Wisconsin